A  (also , , ,  and ) is a celebration of a girl's 15th birthday. It has cultural roots in Mexico and Spain and is widely celebrated by girls throughout Latin America. In Spanish, and in Hispanic America, the term  is reserved solely for the honoree; in English, primarily in the United States, the term is used to refer to the celebrations and honors surrounding the occasion.

This birthday is celebrated differently from any other as it marks the transition from childhood to young womanhood. Historically, in the years prior to their 15th birthdays, girls learned about cooking, weaving, and childbearing from the elder women in their communities in preparation for their future roles as wives. During the celebration the girl's father would present her to potential suitors.

In the past, parallel customs could be found in Southern Europe, mainly Spain and France. Today, the custom remains strongest in Mexico, its likely country of introduction during the viceregal or Mexican imperial periods. However, it is widely celebrated in Spanish-speaking countries in the Americas. The grandest parties are comparable to British and US debutante balls. The celebrations themselves vary significantly in different countries; for example, the festivities in some have taken on more religious overtones than in others.

In the French Caribbean and French Guiana, it is called .

Origin 

Contemporary festivities combine Catholic traditions from old Spain with the traditions of indigenous heritages of pre-Colombian Mexico, along with a few modern twists, and rely heavily on European influence from the period of the Second Mexican Empire For example: In ancient Mexico, the Aztecs and other indigenous peoples had many different ceremonies to mark the passage through the various stages of life. The  marked a young woman's transition to adulthood, as she was presented, as a virgin, to the community for probable suitors. Other origin stories attribute quinceañera history to the Duchess of Alba in Spain, who threw a ball at her palace and invited adolescent girls to attend in formal clothes. This tradition would continue and was reenforced when Empress Carlota of Mexico, granddaughter of the Louis Philippe I of France, threw a similar reception for her court in Mexico City—presenting young women as eligible for marriage. The traditions of the quinceañera wearing elaborate ball gowns, 
utilizing courtly European social customs, and ballroom dancing coincides with the styles and customs of the period of the Second Mexican Empire, which was an extension of the European royal courts of the time.

There is also a "man of honor" who accompanies the young woman. Potential suitors present gifts to her family to make up a dowry or bridal wealth.

Changes over the years 

The meaning behind the  has become more refined over time and has been adapted by various Latino cultures in relation to where they are living.

In rural societies, girls were considered ready for marriage once they turned 15. In the 20th century, the  received certain privileges associated with womanhood: permission to attend adult parties, pluck her eyebrows and shave her legs, wear makeup, jewelry and high heels. Friends and family gathered in order to give the girl a chance to mingle with young men. Rich families celebrated  with big parties and elaborate dresses. In Latin American countries, wealthy families announced  in the newspapers to publicize their extravagant celebrations.

In the 1960s, as more Latinos migrated to the United States, they brought their differing national traditions with them. Once in the United States, formerly poor immigrants with good jobs were able to have big parties such as those back in their home country. Family and friends often help put on the event, for example, by making food. From a simple food and cake celebration, it has developed among wealthier families to become an occasion for a big party. Families may use event planners, and develop a celebration with a theme, to be staged with a special entrance and dances, and captured by professional photoshoots and video. Modern  celebrations also incorporate traditions from other cultures. Markets for event planners and -related products have developed.

In specific countries

Cuba 

They are usually inexperienced dancers whose function is to highlight the central couple. The male dancers are also allowed to wear tuxedos in different colors.

Fifteenth-birthday celebrations were very popular in Cuba until the late 1970s. This practice partly entered Cuba via Spain, but the greatest influence was the French. These celebrations usually took place in the house of the girl or the more spacious house of a relative.

Another tradition, commonly found in Cuba, is to have 14 ladies and 14 escorts (sometimes 7 each) as a court. The escorts hold flowers (usually roses) and the ladies carry candles. As the  dances the waltz with her father, she blows out one candle, then picks up one rose. This continues until she has blown out all the candles and picked up all the roses. The 14 candles blown out represent her 14 previous years, and with each she makes a wish. When the time comes to cut the cake, the  will blow out her last candle, thus completing her 15 wishes. The flowers are given to her mother.

Colombia 

In Colombia, the  starts with the arrival of the teenage girl, accompanied by her father; she is received by her mother and other relatives and friends; father and daughter dance a waltz and other tunes. The  birthday girl next dances with her brothers (if any) and their uncles and godparents.

For this occasion the teenager wears an evening dress in light colors or pastels, is dressed and made up slightly, and usually places a tiara in her hair and jewels on her neck and hands. All the guests dress in formal attire, including the teenager's peers.

After the first dance, the teenager and her friends have a dance. It is optional to make some surprise dance performed by the  birthday girl (alone or accompanied), and a dance that will give away her friends, cousins, and others.

The custom's social significance is such that even poor families tend to spend lavishly on a daughter's . The event can cost as much as a year's wages, and many take up debt to be able to pay for it.

French Guiana and French Caribbean 

It follows a similar structure.

Mexico 
By tradition, this was to be the first time she would wear makeup in public, but in the 21st century, girls start using makeup at an earlier age. The  is also expected to wear a formal evening dress, traditionally a long, elegant ball gown chosen by the girl and most often, her mother, according to her favorite color and style.

In the Mexican Catholic tradition, the  celebration begins with a thanksgiving Mass. She arrives at church accompanied by her parents, godparents, and court of honor. At this religious mass, a Rosary, or sometimes a necklace with a locket or pendant depicting Mexico's patron saint, the Virgin of Guadalupe, is presented to the teenager by her godparents, the necklace or rosary having been previously blessed by the priest. She is also awarded a tiara, which serves as a reminder that to her loved ones, especially her immediate family, the  will always be a princess. Some also see it as denoting that she is a "princess" before God and the world. After this, the girl may leave her bouquet of flowers on the altar for the Virgin Mary.

After the thanksgiving mass, guests gather for a celebratory reception where the events to honor the  will take place, including giving gifts. This reception may be held at the 's home, at venues (such as dining halls, banquet halls, or casinos), or in some cases, in more public places, similar to a block party. During the reception, the birthday girl usually dances a traditional waltz with her father to a song chosen by both that speaks about the occasion and their relationship. Often this section of the celebration is previously practiced and/or choreographed, often weeks in advance, sometimes even with months of anticipation.

The basic reception has six major parts with dances taking place while a traditional Mexican meal is served:
 The formal entry – A grand entrance made by the  once most guests have been seated.
 The formal toast– An optional but usually featured part of the reception, generally initiated by the parents or godparents of the birthday girl.
 The first dance – Usually a waltz where the girl dances, starting with her father.
 The general dance – Also usually a traditional waltz.
Traditionally, Mexican girls could not dance in public until they turned 15, except at school dances or at family events. So the waltz with her  is choreographed and elaborate to celebrate what was meant to be the 's first public dance.

Some families may choose to add a ceremonial components to the celebration, depending on local customs. The ceremony of the last doll is based on a Maya tradition; it is related to the birthday girl's later giving up of the doll as she grows into womanhood.

Once all symbolic gestures have taken place, the dinner is begun. At this point, the celebration reaches its peak; live musical groups begin playing music, keeping the guests entertained. The music is played while the guests dine, chat, mingle, and dance.
The next morning the family and closest friends may also attend a special breakfast, especially if they are staying with the family.

In recent years, many girls, mostly from the Mexico City suburbs, tend to prefer a small party with their close family or friends, and ask for a paid vacation, instead of having their families invest a lot of money on a  party.

Spain 
 are growing in popularity in Spain, which sees frequent emigration from the countries of the former Spanish Empire. The demand has grown so much that Spanish event companies now specialize in organizing  parties for Latin American communities across Spain, where events typically cost thousands of euros and guests number in the hundreds. According to Luisa Sánchez-Rivas, a Spanish sociolinguist who specializes in liminality, the parties are considered especially significant for Latin American immigrants in Spain as a way to protect and preserve their non-Spanish cultural identity. The concept has not caught on among Spaniards, although one company in Madrid that specializes in  organized one for a girl from a Spanish family.

United States 

Quinceañeras were noted to be celebrated in the mid- to late 1970s in Los Angeles and San Diego and in the early 1980s in different parts of Texas. In recent years,  have gained popularity in the United States. Books and other publications about  distributed in the United States increasingly include English versions to the original works in Spanish. This shows the increasing influence of Hispanic and Latino culture within the broader American culture. The increasing popularity of the celebration has begun to lead to an uptick in retailers and businesses catering directly to young Hispanic or Latina women.

New traditions 

In the 21st century, many girls create their own  celebrations. Whereas traditional dresses were formal and usually white or pink only, dress designs are now more varied. Also, instead of having the traditional seven  and seven , the  may pick all  or all . Traditionally, girls were not allowed to dance in public until turning 15, but this taboo has also receded significantly. The ceremony of the Changing of the Shoes has also been modified. Instead of wearing slippers before ceremonially exchanging them for high heels, a girl may decide to wear shoes compatible with the color and style of her dress instead of donning the traditional slippers.

Celebrity 
Eva Longoria
Francia Raisa
Bella Thorne
Aimee Garcia
Jacqueline Saburido
Kenia Sosa, daughter of MLB player Sammy Sosa
Justina Machado
Chiquis Rivera, daughter of the late Jenni Rivera

in popular culture 
Kirkus Reviews calls Argentinian American author Yamile Saied Méndez's 2022 novel Twice a Quinceañera: A Delightful Second Chance Romance  “enchanting.”. The story tells how  “After breaking off a five-year engagement, a young woman embarks on a quest for self-love by throwing herself a Double Quinceañera for her 30th birthday.”

specials 

Notable -related movies and television episodes
Wizards of Waverly Place - "Quinceañera"
Stuck in the Middle - "Stuck In the Quinceaňera", "Stuck In a Fakeout", "Stuck In Harley's Quinceaňera"
George Lopez - "Bringing Home the Bacon"
Quiero Mis Quinces
My Super Sweet 16 - "Janelle", "Alexa", "Stephanie", and "Alana"
Party Mamas
Cake Boss
Sweet 15
Quinceañera
Superstore - S4 E17 "Quinceañera"
One Day at a Time
Jack Ryan - S2E2: "Tertiary Optio"
Top Chef - "Quinceaňera"
Austin & Ally - "Quinceaňeras & Clubs"
On My Block - S1 E7 "Chapter Seven"
The Fosters - S1 E4 "Quinceañera"
Taina - Quinceañero
Sweet 15: Quinceañera
Dora the Explorer - "Daisy, La Quinceañera"
Handy Manny - S2 E31 "Quinceañera"
High School Musical: The Musical: The Series - S2 E5 "The Quinceañero"
McFarland, USA
The Proud Family: Louder and Prouder, S1 E9 "Raging Bully"
Elena of Avalor, S1 E18 "My Fair Naomi"
Superman & Lois, S2 E5 "Girl, You’ll Be a Woman Soon"
The Casagrandes; S3 E6 15 Candles
Marvel's Runaways - "Last Waltz"
High School Musical: The Musical: The Series - S2 E5
Christmas With You

See also 

 Rite of passage
 Confirmation
 Cotillion ball
 Debutante
 Sweet sixteen (birthday)
 
 Bar and bat mitzvah 
 Cug Huê Hng
 Philippine debut

References 
Notes

Bibliography
 Alvarez, Julia. Once Upon a Quinceañera: Coming of Age in the USA. NY: Viking, 2007.
 Härkönen, Heidi. "Girls' 15-Year Birthday Celebration as Cuban Women's Space Outside of the Revolutionary State", Journal of the Association of Social Anthropologists, July 2011
 Mitchell, Caludia and Reid-Walsh, Jacqueline. Girl Culture: Studying Girl Culture – A Readers' Guide. ABC-CLIO 2008, pp. 493–496
 Stavans, Ilans (ed.) Quinceaņera. ABC-CLIO, 2010,

External links 
 

Articles containing video clips
Birthdays
Debutante balls
Latin American culture
Mexican culture
Rites of passage